The following is a list of notable performers of rock and roll music or rock music, and others directly associated with the music as producers, songwriters or in other closely related roles, who died in 2017. The list gives their date, cause and location of death, and their age.

List

See also

 27 Club
 List of murdered hip hop musicians

References

External links
 The Dead Rock Stars Club
 Youngest Rock Star Deaths

Deaths in rock and roll
Deaths in rock and roll

Rock and roll, 2010s
2010s deaths in rock and roll